Oscilla is a genus of very small sea snails, minute marine gastropod mollusks or micromollusks. This genus is currently placed in the subfamily Chrysallidinae of the family Pyramidellidae.

These marine gastropods have shells with intorted protoconchs.

Life history
Little is known about the biology of the members of this genus. As is true of most members of the Pyramidellidae sensu lato, they are likely to be ectoparasites.

Oscilla jocosa may possibly be a parasite on Trochus erithreus (Mienis 2003).

Species of Oscilla
The following species are mentioned in WoRMS:

 Oscilla annulata (A. Adams in H. & A. Adams, 1853)
 Oscilla appeliusi (Hornung & Mermod, 1925)
 Oscilla aqabaensis Peñas, Rolán & Sabelli, 2020
 Oscilla aquilonia Pimenta, Santos & Absalao, 2008
 Oscilla axialyrae Peñas & Rolán, 2017
 Oscilla beccarii (Hormung & Mermod, 1924)
 Oscilla bellardii (Hornung & Mermod, 1924)
 Oscilla bifida Peñas & Rolán, 2017
 Oscilla cingulata (A. Adams, 1861) (Type species) (as Monoptygma (Oscilla) cingulata)
 Oscilla circinata A. Adams, 1867 
 Oscilla composita Peñas & Rolán, 2017
 Oscilla cylindrica de Folin, 1879) 
 Oscilla duplex Laseron, 1959) 
 Oscilla evanida Melvill, 1904
 Oscilla faceta Melvill, 1904
 Oscilla felix (Dall & Bartsch, 1906)
 Oscilla ficara (Bartsch, 1915)
 Oscilla fortefunis Peñas & Rolán, 2017
 Oscilla galilae Bogi, Karhan & Yokeş, 2012
 Oscilla gemella Peñas & Rolán, 2017  
 Oscilla infraduplex Peñas & Rolán, 2017
 Oscilla istiusmodi Peñas & Rolán, 2017 
 Oscilla jocosa Melvill, 1904
 Oscilla jocosior Saurin, 1959
 Oscilla koheii (Nomura, 1937)
 Oscilla ligata (Angas, 1877)
 Oscilla marquesensis Peñas & Rolán, 2017
 Oscilla mirabilis (Preston, 1905)
 Oscilla mirifica Peñas, Rolán & Sabelli, 2020 
 Oscilla multifuniculi Peñas & Rolán, 2017 
 Oscilla multistriata Peñas, Rolán & Sabelli, 2020
 Oscilla mutuensis (Nomura, 1938)
 Oscilla niasensis Thiele, 1925 
 Oscilla notialis Pimenta, Santos & Absalao, 2008
 Oscilla obtusa (Gould, 1861 in 1859-61)
 Oscilla obtusantis (Saurin, 1961)
 Oscilla ogasaensis (Nomura, 1939)
 Oscilla ongcopensis (Saurin, 1961) 
 Oscilla parvicoronata Peñas & Rolán, 2017 
 Oscilla perfelix (Nomura, 1938)
 Oscilla punicea (W. R. B. Oliver, 1915)
 Oscilla pupula Thiele, 1925 
 Oscilla sculptulata Peñas & Rolán, 2017
 Oscilla solomonensis Peñas & Rolán, 2017 
 Oscilla somersi (Verrill & Bush, 1900)
 Oscilla sulcibasis Peñas & Rolán, 2017
 Oscilla tasmanica (Tenison-Woods, 1876)
 Oscilla tempeii (Nomura, 1937)
 Oscilla tornata (A. E. Verrill, 1884)
 Oscilla tricordata (Nomura, 1938)
 Oscilla uahukaensis Peñas & Rolán, 2017 
 Oscilla vanuatuensis Peñas & Rolán, 2017
 Oscilla virginiae Peñas, Rolán & Sabelli, 2020 
 Oscilla voorwindei (Laseron, 1959)

The following species are also mentioned in OBIS  and Malacolog 
 Oscilla biseriata Gabb, 1881
 Oscilla stupa  (Hori, S. & H. Fukuda, 1999) 
Species brought into synonymy
 Oscilla bosyuensis (Nomura, S., 1937): synonym of Odetta bosyuensis (Nomura, 1937)
 Oscilla dautzenbergi de Morgan, 1916 † : synonym of Pyrgula dautzenbergi (de Morgan, 1916) † (new combination) 
 Oscilla fallax Thiele, 1925: synonym of Bulimoscilla fallax (Thiele, 1925)
 Oscilla gumia: synonym of Hinemoa gumia (Hedley, 1909)
 Oscilla indica Melvill, 1896: synonym of Hinemoa indica (Melvill, 1896)
 Oscilla insculpta (Carpenter) Keep, 1888: synonym of Iolaea eucosmia Dall & Bartsch, 1909
 Oscilla laquearia: synonym of Hinemoa laquearia (Hedley, 1909)
 Oscilla leviplex: synonym of Hinemoa leviplex Laseron, 1959
 Oscilla lirata (A. Adams, 1860): synonym of Odetta lirata (A. Adams, 1860)
 Oscilla migma: synonym of Hinemoa migma (Hedley, 1909)
 Oscilla sumatrana Thiele, 1925: synonym of Menesthella sumatrana (Thiele, 1925)

The European species have been revised by van Aartsen (1994).

References

 Vaught, K. C. (1989). In Abbott, R. T. & Boss, K. J. (eds) A Classification of the Living Mollusca. Melbourne, Florida: American Malacologists Inc. 195 pp.
 
 
 
 Gofas, S.; Le Renard, J.; Bouchet, P. (2001). Mollusca, in: Costello, M.J. et al. (Ed.) (2001). European register of marine species: a check-list of the marine species in Europe and a bibliography of guides to their identification. Collection Patrimoines Naturels, 50: pp. 180–213

External links
 
 Oscilla voorwindei
 Oscilla tricordata

Pyramidellidae